Myrna Crescenda Anselma Plate (14 September 1936 – October 2008) was a Dutch Antillean fencer. She competed in the women's individual foil event at the 1968 Summer Olympics.

References

External links
 

1936 births
2008 deaths
Dutch Antillean female foil fencers
Olympic fencers of Netherlands Antilles
Fencers at the 1968 Summer Olympics
Curaçao female foil fencers